Bosnia and Herzegovina, having become independent from the Socialist Federal Republic of Yugoslavia in 1992, made its Paralympic Games début at the 1996 Summer Paralympics in Atlanta, with merely two athletes competing in men's track and field. The country has competed in every edition of the Summer Paralympics since then, and made its Winter Paralympics début at the 2010 Winter Paralympics in Vancouver, with a single representative in alpine skiing.

Bosnia and Herzegovina has won six Paralympic medals, all in men's sitting volleyball: silvers in 2000, 2008 and in 2016, two golds in 2004 and 2012 and one bronze in 2020.

Medallists

See also
 Bosnia and Herzegovina at the Olympics
 Bosnia and Herzegovina men's national sitting volleyball team

References